Soweto Cricket Oval is a multi-purpose stadium in Soweto, Gauteng. The ground is mainly used for organizing matches of cricket, although it has also been used occasionally for football and local events. The stadium hosted its only first-class match on October 27, 1995, where South Africa and England played to a draw. It has also hosted two List A matches, and was used as one of the venues during the 1998 Under-19 World Cup.

It has hosted local events such as the Hugh Masekela Heritage Festival.

References

External links
 cricketarchive
 Cricinfo

Cricket grounds in South Africa
Cricket in Gauteng
Sport in Johannesburg
Buildings and structures in Soweto